Dimbelenge is a territory in Kasai-Central province of the Democratic Republic of the Congo.

Territories of Kasaï-Central Province